Ted Obudzinski (born 17 January 1954) is a former Australian rules footballer who played with South Melbourne in the Victorian Football League (VFL).

Notes

External links 

Living people
1954 births
Australian rules footballers from New South Wales
Sydney Swans players